Syarhey Hlyabko ((Sergey Glebko); born 23 August 1992) is a Belarusian professional football player currently playing for Slutsk.

Honours
BATE Borisov
Belarusian Premier League champion: 2010

External links

1992 births
Living people
Belarusian footballers
Belarus youth international footballers
Association football midfielders
Belarusian expatriate footballers
Expatriate footballers in Slovakia
Belarusian expatriate sportspeople in Slovakia
2. Liga (Slovakia) players
FC BATE Borisov players
FC Slutsk players
FC Gorodeya players
FC Torpedo Minsk players
Partizán Bardejov players
FC Gomel players
FC Belshina Bobruisk players